Francis Kearney (1785–1837),  Francis Kearny, was an American engraver and lithographer, active in Philadelphia and New York. He was born and died in Perth Amboy, New Jersey, and studied under Peter Rushton Maverick.

References

1785 births
1837 deaths
American engravers
American lithographers
People from Perth Amboy, New Jersey